Moderate Venstre may refer to:
Moderate Venstre (Denmark), a former political party in Denmark
Moderate Liberal Party, a former political party in Norway

See also
 Moderate left
 Venstre